DC Central Kitchen is a nationally recognized "community kitchen" that recycles food from around Washington, D.C., and uses it as a tool to train unemployed adults to develop work skills while providing thousands of meals for local service agencies in the process. Chef José Andrés serves on the board.

History 
DC Central Kitchen was founded in 1989 by Robert Egger. Egger was working in the bar/nightclub scene in DC when he and his wife were talked into volunteering with a church group that bought food to prepare and distribute from the back of a van. Its first major food recovery was from the 1989 inaugural party for President George H. W. Bush.

That same year, DC Central Kitchen started a culinary training program.  In 2011, the organization started its Healthy Corners Initiative in an effort to bring affordable produce to low-income neighborhoods.

In 2017, the organization joined with The Craig Newmark Philanthropic Fund to run a matching campaign during the Campus Kitchens Project fundraising challenge, "Raise the Dough."  That same year, the Washington Capitals teamed up with SuperFD Catering to create a cookbook pledging to donate one hundred percent of the proceeds from sales to DC Central Kitchen.

Since its creation, the Kitchen has served over 21 million meals, graduated over 700 formerly homeless men and women from its Culinary Job Training program, and replicated its model on college and high-school campuses through its program The Campus Kitchen Project.

References

External links

DC Central Kitchen's Website
Profile of Robert Egger on How To Make a Difference
A Hand Up In a DC System Full of Letdowns - The Washington Post
Catering With Conscience - The Christian Science Monitor

Non-profit organizations based in Washington, D.C.
Organizations established in 1989
1989 establishments in Washington, D.C.